Salah Abu Seif (May 10, 1915 – June 23, 1996) was one of the most famous Egyptian film directors, and is considered to be the godfather of Neorealist cinema in Egyptian cinema. Many of the 41 films he directed are considered Egyptian classics with 11 films in the Top 100 Egyptian films list. His film The Beginning and the End (1960) was the first adaptation of a novel by Nobel Prize winner Naguib Mahfouz. In 1977 he was a member of the jury at the 10th Moscow International Film Festival.

Early life 
Abu-Seif was born in 1915, in Cairo's ancient quarter of Boolaq, to landowning parents from Upper Egypt. He was 12 years old when he saw the first full- length feature film made by an Egyptian, in 1927, at a local movie-house - earlier films were imports accompanied by Egyptian narrations, or made by Europeans living in Egypt. As the son of a conservative family, Abu-Seif graduated from the Cairo College of Commerce and Economics in 1932, while at the same time working as a freelance reporter following movie stars. But it was at his day job as a clerk in a factory that he met the Egyptian film-maker Niazy Mustapha, who was on a shoot there. Mustapha made him a film editor.

In 1939, Abu-Seif won a scholarship to study film in Paris. Within five years of his return in 1942, he had established himself as one of the most avant-garde second generation film-makers in the country. He pioneered shooting on location - though he also used reconstructions - in places none of his predecessors had dared to visit, like ghurza (the equivalent of old Chinese opium dens), brothels and impoverished areas whose existence had never been officially acknowledged.

Filmography

See also 
Kamal El Sheikh.
Hassan Al-Imam.
Mahmoud Zulfikar.
CIFF Top 100 Egyptian films.

References

External links
 .

Egyptian film directors
1915 births
1996 deaths